Hard Band for Dead is the sixth studio album by The Toasters.

Track listing
 "2-Tone Army" - 3:19
 "Talk Is Cheap" - 3:11
 "Friends" - 2:56
 "Secret Agent Man" - 2:40
 "Chuck Berry" - 2:38
 "Mouse" - 3:44
 "Hard Man Fe Dead" - 3:05
 "Don't Come Running" - 3:13
 "Properly" - 2:44
 "Maxwell Smart" - 1:58
 "I Wasn't Going To Call You Anyway" - 3:01
 "Speak Your Mind" - 3:11
 "Skaternity" - 2:41
 "Dave Goes Crazy" - 2:07

Reception

AllMusic praised Hard Band for Dead for being a good example of third wave ska while honoring music that came before The Toasters.

Charts

References

1996 albums
The Toasters albums